The Stone–Geary utility function takes the form

For , the Stone–Geary function reduces to the generalised Cobb–Douglas function.

The Stone–Geary utility function gives rise to the Linear Expenditure System. In case of  the demand function equals

The Stone–Geary utility function was first derived by Roy C. Geary, in a comment on earlier work by Lawrence Klein and Herman Rubin. Richard Stone was the first to estimate the Linear Expenditure System.

References

Further reading
 
 

Utility function types